Streptomyces sp. myrophorea, isolate McG1 is a species of Streptomyces, that originates from a (ethnopharmacology) folk cure in the townland of Toneel North in Boho, County Fermanagh. This area was previously occupied by the Druids (~1500 years ago) and before this neolithic people (~ 3,700 years ago) who  engraved the nearby Reyfad stones. Streptomyces sp. myrophorea is inhibitory to many species of ESKAPE pathogens, can grow at high pH (10.5) and can tolerate relatively high levels of radioactivity.

Physiology and morphology 
Streptomyces sp. myrophorea isolate McG1 has light green to white spores and hyphae when cultivated on SFM agar.
The colonies of Streptomyces sp. myrophorea  have a distinctly dusty appearance and  produce an aroma similar to germaline on maturation. This bacteria produces many spores, approximately 0.5-1.0 micrometers in width which form in straight chains.

Ecology 
Streptomyces sp. myrophorea isolate McG1 was discovered in an alkaline, species rich environment. This bacteria grows at a maximum pH of 10.5, and is therefore alkaliphilic. The bacteria  tolerate higher levels of alkalinity but do not thrive.
Streptomyces sp. myrophorea  can also withstand relatively high levels of radiation (up to 4kGy. This may be related to the underlying limestone and shale substrata which emits radon gas.

Antibiotic production 
Only antibiotic gene synthesis clusters  have been identified in Streptomyces sp. myrophorea; the antibiotics actually produced in-situ have yet to be identified.  Streptomyces sp. McG1 is broadly inhibitory to both Gram positive and Gram negative bacteria including carbapenem  resistant Acinetobacter baumannii, (a critical pathogen on the World Health Organization priority pathogens list), vancomycin resistant Enterococcus faecium, methicillin resistant Staphylococcus aureus (listed as high priority) and Klebsiella pneumoniae. Streptomyces sp. myrophorea has limited effects against strains of  Enterococcus faecium and Pseudomonas aeruginosa.

Alkaline tolerance 
Streptomyces sp. myrophorea may be able to flourish in an alkaline environment because it contains many genes similar to those associated with alkaline tolerance in other bacterial species.

Streptomyces sp. myrophorea list of alkaline tolerance genes:

In-vitro antibiotic resistance 
The presence of antibiotic resistance genes is often linked to the production of antibiotics. Stretpomyces sp. myrophorea has been recorded to be resistant to 28 antibiotics and sensitive to eight antibiotics in one series of tests. The antibiotics were tested at breakpoint concentrations recommended by The European Committee on Antimicrobial Susceptibility Testing - EUCAST, to test antimicrobial susceptibility.  
 
Antibiotic sensitivity of Streptomyces sp. myrophorea:
Sensitivities  recorded as: Sensitivite (S), Resistant (R) or Intermediate (I).

Whole genome sequencing 
The genome sequence of Streptomyces sp. myrophorea, isolate McG1 was deposited at the NCBI
(TaxID 2099643),
Biosample accession number SAMN08518548,
BioProject accession number PRJNA433829,
Submission ID: SUB3653175
Locus tag prefix: C4625. https://www.ncbi.nlm.nih.gov/bioproject/433829.
Link to NCBI sequence read archive (SRA) https://www.ncbi.nlm.nih.gov/sra?LinkName=biosample_sra&from_uid=8518548
Copies of this bacteria are deposited in the National Collection of Type Cultures (NCTC), UK and the Deutsche Sammlung von Mikroorganismen und Zellkulturen (DSMZ) GmbH, Germany.

References

External links 

Extremophiles
Alkaliphiles
Actinomycetota
Streptomyces
Limestone
Fermanagh and Omagh district
Undescribed species